Tomaž Čopi (born 2 July 1970) is a Slovenian sailor. He competed at the 1996 Summer Olympics, the 2000 Summer Olympics, and the 2004 Summer Olympics.

References

External links
 

1970 births
Living people
Slovenian male sailors (sport)
Olympic sailors of Slovenia
Sailors at the 1996 Summer Olympics – 470
Sailors at the 2000 Summer Olympics – 470
Sailors at the 2004 Summer Olympics – 470
Sportspeople from Koper
20th-century Slovenian people
21st-century Slovenian people